Events in the year 2018 in Paraguay.

Incumbents
 President: Horacio Cartes (until 15 August): Mario Abdo Benítez (from 15 August)
 Vice President: Juan Afara

Events 

22 April –  the 2018 Paraguayan general election.
15 August – Mario Abdo Benítez took over as the new president of Paraguay.

Deaths

19 June – Efrén Echeverría, musician (b. 1932).

References

 
2010s in Paraguay
Years of the 21st century in Paraguay
Paraguay
Paraguay